Charles F. Nelan (April 10, 1859 – December 7, 1904) was an American artist and political cartoonist, known for his cartoons on the Spanish–American War, some 135 of which appeared in the New York Herald. His work in the Philadelphia North American was often critical of Samuel Pennypacker and Matthew Quay. Nelan's work also helped solidify the image of Uncle Sam as a personification of the United States.

References

External links

1859 births
1904 deaths
American editorial cartoonists
American illustrators
Artists from Akron, Ohio